Silný (feminine: Silná) is a Czech surname meaning "strong". Notable people with the surname include:

 Barbora Silná (born 1989), Czech-Austrian ice dancer
 Jan Silný (born 1995), Czech footballer
 Josef Silný (1902–1981), Czech football player
 Libuše Silný (born 1937), Czechoslovak speed skater

See also
 
 

Czech-language surnames